Self-Portrait is a 1648–1640 painted self-portrait by Jacob Jordaens. In 2016 Madame Generet left it and Anthony van Dyck's The Apostle Matthew from her private collection to Belgium's Fondation Roi Baudouin (Patrimoine). It is now on long-term loan to the Rubenshuis in Antwerp.

External links

Jordaens
1640s paintings
17th-century portraits
Paintings in the collection of the Rubenshuis
Paintings by Jacob Jordaens